Delaware Valley High School in Milford, Pennsylvania, United States, is a high school that serves grades 912 and is located in Pike County. As of 2019, it serves 1,517 students. The school is operated by the Delaware Valley School District.

Overview 

It is located at 252 Routes 6 and 209 in Westfall Township, between Milford and Matamoras. The original high school was built in 1956 when the Milford High School and the Matamoras High School merged. The main part of the current high school was constructed in 1972 and has had many additions since then to meet student demand. The school is split into two sub-schools, a 9/10 High School serving grades 9 and 10 and an 11/12 High School serving grades 11 and 12. Each section has its own set of administration, guidance counselors, etc. This school also has the Delaware Valley Middle School attached, which consists of children in 6–8.  They also have their own set of administration, and guidance counselors.

References

External links 
Delaware Valley High School at publicschoolreview.com
Delaware Valley School District Football Page
Delaware Valley Class of 78 page with info about 30th Reunion
http://www.kings.edu/news/05-09/FrenchDel.htm

Public high schools in Pennsylvania
Schools in Pike County, Pennsylvania
1956 establishments in Pennsylvania